Thomas Jefferson High School for Advanced Studies, more commonly known as simply Thomas Jefferson High School, is a public high school in the city of Gretna in Jefferson Parish, Louisiana. It has consistently ranked among the state's best public high schools and is also among the most diverse  It is part of the Jefferson Parish Public Schools system. The school had 389 students in 2016. It has 60 percent minority enrollment. The school is at 17 Gretna Boulevard.

The school mascot is a jaguar and the colors california blue, gray, and black.

Athletics
Thomas Jefferson High athletics competes in the LHSAA.

Sports programs include:

Men's
Baseball
Basketball
Football
Soccer
Swimming
Track & Field
Wrestling

Women's
Basketball
Soccer
Softball
Swimming
Tennis
Volleyball

References 

Schools in Jefferson Parish, Louisiana
Public high schools in Louisiana